The 1953–54 Hannover 96 season is the 58th season in the football club's history and sixth overall season in the top flight of German football, the Oberliga Nord, and their fifth consecutive season having been reinstated in 1949 after appealing against their relegation to the Landesliga Niedersachsen in 1948. Hannover 96 won the Oberliga Nord and advanced to the championship finals for the fifth overall time, where they won their second German championship after 1938. The season covers a period from 1 July 1953 to 30 June 1954.

Players

Squad information

Source:

Competitions

Overview

Oberliga Nord

League table

Results summary

Results by round

Matches

German football championship

Group 1

Final

Statistics

Goalscorers

Clean sheets

References

Hannover 96 seasons
Hannover 96
German football championship-winning seasons